This is a list of the prime ministers of the Kingdom of Sardina (Italian: Presidenti del Consiglio dei Ministri del Regno di Sardegna) from the granting of the Statuto Albertino in 1848 until the proclamation of the Kingdom of Italy in 1861.

Chief ministers of the Kingdom of Sardina (1730–1848)
1730–1740: Giovanni Cristoforo Zoppi
1742–1745: Carlo Vincenzo Ferrero d'Ormea
1756–1763: Giuseppe Osorio Alarcòn
1768–1779: Carlo Luigi Caissotti
1789–1793: Giuseppe Ignazio Corte

Presidents of the Council of Ministers (1848–1861)

Parties:

Governments:

Timeline

See also
List of monarchs of Sardinia

Prime ministers of the Kingdom of Sardinia
Prime ministers of the Kingdom of Sardinia